Afyonkarahisar ("poppy, opium", kara "black", hisar "fortress") is a city in western Turkey. It is the administrative centre of Afyonkarahisar Province and Afyonkarahisar District. Its population is 251,799 (2021).
In Turkey, Afyonkarahisar stands out as a capital city of hot springs and spas, an important junction of railway, highway and air traffic in West-Turkey, and the place where independence was won.
In addition, Afyonkarahisar is one of the top leading provinces in agriculture, globally renowned for its marble and is the world's largest producer of pharmaceutical opium.

Etymology
The name Afyon Kara Hisar literally means opium black castle in Turkish, since opium was widely grown here and there is a castle on a black rock. Also known simply as Afyon. Older spellings include Karahisar-i Sahip, Afium-Kara-hissar and Afyon Karahisar. The city was known as Afyon (opium), until the name was changed to Afyonkarahisar by the Turkish Parliament in 2004.

History

The top of the rock in Afyon has been fortified for a long time. It was known to the Hittites as Hapanuwa, and was later occupied by Phrygians, Lydians and Achaemenid Persians until it was conquered by Alexander the Great. After the death of Alexander the city (now known as  Akroinοn (Ακροϊνόν) or Nikopolis (Νικόπολις) in Ancient Greek), was ruled by the Seleucids and the kings of Pergamon, then Rome and Byzantium. The Byzantine emperor Leo III after his victory over Arab besiegers in 740 renamed the city Nicopolis (Greek for "city of victory"). The Seljuq Turks then arrived in 1071 and changed its name to Kara Hissar ("black castle") after the ancient fortress situated upon a volcanic rock 201 meters above the town. Following the dispersal of the Seljuqs the town was occupied by the Sâhib Ata and then the Germiyanids.

The castle was much fought over during the Crusades and was finally conquered by the Ottoman Sultan Beyazid I in 1392 but was lost after the invasion of Timur Lenk in 1402. It was recaptured in 1428 or 1429.

The area thrived during the Ottoman Empire, as the centre of opium production and Afyon became a wealthy city. From 1867 until 1922, Afyon was part of the Hüdavendigâr vilayet of the Ottoman Empire. In 1902, a fire burning for 32 hours destroyed parts of the city.

During the 1st World War British prisoners of war who had been captured at Gallipoli were housed here in an empty Armenian church at the foot of the rock. During the Greco-Turkish War (1919-1922) campaign (part of the Turkish War of Independence)  Afyon and the surrounding hills were occupied by Greek forces. However, it was recovered on 27 August 1922, a key moment in the Turkish counter-attack in the Aegean region. After 1923 Afyon became a part of the Republic of Turkey.

The region was a major producer of raw opium (hence the name Afyon) until the late 1960s when under international pressure, from the US in particular, the fields were burnt and production ceased.  Now poppies are grown under a strict licensing regimen.  They do not produce raw opium any more but derive Morphine and other opiates using the poppy straw method of extraction.

Afyon was depicted on the reverse of the Turkish 50 lira banknote of 1927–1938.

Economy
The economy of Afyonkarahisar is based on agriculture, industries and thermal tourism. 
Especially its agriculture is strongly developed from the fact, a large part of its population living in the countrysides. Which stimulated agricultural activities greatly.

Marble
Afyonkarahisar produces an important chunk of Turkish processed marbles, it ranks second on processed marble exports and fourth on travertine. Afyon holds an important share of Turkish marble reserves, with some 12,2% of total Turkish reserves.

Afyon has unique marble types and colors, which were historically very renown and are unique to Afyon. Like "Afyon white", historically known as "Synnadic white". "Afyon Menekse", historically known as "Pavonazzetto" and "Afyon kaplan postu", this type was not popular.
Historically marble from Afyon was generally referred to as "Docimeaen marble".
Docimian marble was highly admired and valued for its unique colors and fine grained quality, by ancients such as Romans. When the Romans took control over Docimian quarries, they were blown away about the beautiful color combinations of Docimian Pavonazzetto, which is a type of white marble with purple veins. A trend started about it right away. Emperors Augustus, Trajan, Hadrian, all made extensive use of Docimian marble to all their major building projects.

Docimian Pavonazzetto was extensively used in major building projects in the very heart of Rome aka Forum Romanum and all over the empire. Pavonazzetto was used on the most eye catching places such as, columns, wall and floor veneer and wall reliefs. Other marbles from all corners of the empire were used in combination, whenever Pavonazzetto was used as floor cover, it was usually in combination with other decorative marbles. But, the Pavonazzetto being a white marble was mostly the dominant color and gave the buildings a freshening white color.    

One of the greatest Roman architectural piece, the Pantheon contains Docimian Pavonazzetto as floor pavement along with other marble types. The dominant white color is the Pavonazzetto, also some of the interior main columns and pilasters are made from Docimian marble.
Other buildings in Roman capital which contains or contained Docimian marble were, 
Forum of Augustus, Forum of Trajan (floor and 184 column shafts), Temple of Mars Ultor (floor), Temple of Apollo (floor), Basilica Aemelia (20 statues), Basilica Julia (floor and some columns), Basilica Ulpia (some of the columns),
Basilica San Paolo Fuori Le Mura (24 columns, destroyed by fire in 1823),
The eight statues on the Arch of Constantine,
The greatest Roman bath, Baths of Caracalla (some of the columns and wall veneer.

Other major buildings outside Rome, Italy were:

The Hagia Sophia has Docimian marble as veneer on the aisles and galleries.

The heart of Catholic Christianity, Saint Peter's Basilica, as veneer.

Lepcis Magna, former limestone columns were replaced with Pavonazzetto.  
     
Library of Celsus, the columns on the famous wall.

Ancient City of Sagalassos, as wall and floor covering, 40 tons of veneer were recovered.

Temple of Zeus and Hera in Greece, 100 columns and wall.

Docimian marble was also preferred for sarcophagi sculpting, some emperors preferred this marble for its high value and majestic looks. As a result, one of the greatest masterpieces were made from this material. Such as sarcophagus of, Sidamara, Silifkeh, Seleukeia, Eudocia, Heraclius....several hundreds sarcophagi were constructed.

Thermal sector
The geography of Afyon has great geothermal activity. Hence, the place has plenty of thermal springs. There are five main springs and all of them have high mineral content with temperatures ranging between 40 and 100 °C. The waters have strong healing properties to some diseases. As a result, plenty of thermal facilities formed over time.

In time, Afyon has developed its thermal sector with more capacity, comfort and innovation. Afyon combined the traditional bath houses with 5-star resorts, the health benefits of the natural springs have put the thermal resorts further then a mere attraction.
Hospitals and universities have come in association with thermal resorts, to utilize the full health potentials of the thermals. 
As such, Afyon Kocatepe University Physical Therapy and Rehabilitation Hospital opened for that purpose. 
Afyon now has the largest residence capacity of thermal resorts, of which a large part are 5-star thermal hotels which give medical care with qualified personnel.

Spa water
Kızılay, was the first mineral water factory in Turkey which opened in Afyon, in 1926 by Atatürk. After the mineral water from Gazligöl springs, healed Atatürk's kidneys and proved its health benefits. Since its foundation, "Kızılay Spa Water" grew as the biggest spa water distributor in Turkey, Middle-East and Balkans.

Pharmaceuticals and morphine
Almost a third of all the morphine produced in the world derives from alkaloids factory in Afyon, named as "Afyon Alkaloids". this large capacity is the byproduct of Afyon's poppy plantations. The pharmaceuticals derive from the opium of the poppy capsules. "Afyon Alkaloids" factory is the largest of its kind in the world, with high capacity processing ability and modern laboratories. The raw opium is put through a chain of biochemical processes, resulting into several types of morphine.

In the Alkaloid Extraction Unit only base morphine is produced. In the adjacent Derivatives Unit half of the morphine extracted is converted to morphine hydrochloride, codeine, codeine phosphate, codeine sulphate, codeine hydrochloride, morphine sulphate, ethylmorphine hydrochloride.

Agriculture

Livestocks
Afyon breeds a large amount of livestocks, its landscape and demography is suitable for this field. As such it ranks in the top 10 within Turkey in terms of amounts of sheep and cattle it has.

Meat and meat products
As a result of being an important source of livestock, related sectors such as meat and meat products are also very productive in Afyon. Its one of the leading provinces in red meat production and has very prestigious brand marks of sausages, such as "Cumhuriyet Sausages".

Eggs
Afyon is the sole leader in egg production within Turkey. It has the largest amount of laying hens, with a figure of 12,7 million. And produces a record amount of 6 million eggs per day.

Cherries and sour cherries
Sour cherries are cultivated in Afyon in very large numbers, so much so that it became very iconic to Afyon. Every year, a sour cherry festival takes place in the Cay district. It is the largest producer of sour cherries in Turkey. The sour cherries grown in Afyon are of excellent quality because of the ideal climate they're grown in. For the same reason Afyon is also an ideal place for cherry cultivation. First quality cherries known as "Napolyon Cherries" are grown in abundance, its one of the top 5 leading provinces.
 
Poppy
One of the iconic agricultural practices of Afyon is the cultivation of poppy. Afyon's climate is ideal for the cultivation of this plant, hence a large amount of poppy plantation occurs in this region. Though, a strong limitation came some decades ago from international laws, cause of the opium content of poppy plants peels. Nevertheless, Afyon is the largest producer of poppy in Turkey and accounts for a large amount of global production.

Potatoes and sugar-beets
Afyon has a durable reputation in potato production, it produces around 8% of Turkish potato need. It ranks in the top 5 in potato, sugar-beets, cucumber and barley production.

Climate
Afyonkarahisar has a Mediterranean climate (Csa) under the Köppen classification and an oceanic climate with a warm summer and a cool winter (Dobk) under the Trewartha classification. The winters are cool and the summers are warm and dry with cool nights. Rainfall occurs mostly during the spring and autumn.

Afyon today

Afyon is the centre of an agricultural area and the city has a country town feel to it. There is little in the way of bars, cafes, live music or other cultural amenities, and the standards of education are low for a city in the west of Turkey. Afyon Kocatepe University. Afyon is known for its marble (in 2005 there were 355 marble quarries in the province of Afyon producing high quality white stone), its sucuk (spiced sausages), its kaymak (meaning either cream or a white Turkish delight) and various handmade weavings. There is also a large cement factory.

This is a natural crossroads, the routes from Ankara to İzmir and from Istanbul to Antalya intersect here and Afyon is a popular stopping-place on these journeys. There are a number of well-established roadside restaurants for travellers to breakfast on the local cuisine. Some of these places are modern well-equipped hotels and spas; the mineral waters of Afyon are renowned for their healing qualities. There is also a long string of roadside kiosks selling the local Turkish delight.

Transport

Afyon is also an important rail junction between İzmir, Konya, Ankara and Istanbul. Afyon is on the route of the planned high-speed rail line between Ankara and Izmir.Zafer Airport, located 60 km from city center, serves Afyonkarahisar. Four flights per week to Istanbul, and seasonal flights to international destinations are available.

Cuisine

Courses 
 sucuk - the famed local speciality, a spicy beef sausage, eaten fried or grilled. The best known brands include Cumhuriyet, Ahmet İpek, İkbal, İtimat and Danet but only 2 brands has the geographical indication and these are Cumhuriyet & Danet (Vahdet Et).
 ağzaçık or bükme - filo-style pastry stuffed with cheese or lentils.
 keşkek - boiled wheat and chick peas stewed with meat.

Sweets 
 local cream kaymak eaten with honey, with a bread pudding ekmek kadayıf, or with pumpkin simmered in syrup. Best eaten at the famous Ikbal restaurants (either the old one in the town centre or the big place on the main road).
 Turkish delight.
 helva - sweetened ground sesame

Main sights
 Afyonkarahisar Castle
 Victory Museum (Zafer Müzesi), a national military and war museum, which was used as headquarters by then Commander-in-Chief Mustafa Kemal Pasha (Atatürk), his chief general staff and army commanders before the Great Offensive in August 1922.  In the very city center, across the fortress, featuring maps, uniforms, photos, guns from the Greco-Turkish War.
 The partly ruined fortress which has given the city its name. To reach at the top, eight hundred stairs need to be climbed.
 The Afyonkarahisar Archaeological Museum which houses thousands of Hellenic, Frigian, Hittite, Roman, Ottoman finds.
 Afyon Ulu Camii (the Great Mosque)
 Altıgöz Bridge, like the Ulu Camii built by the Seljuqs in the 13th century.
 Afyon mansion situated on a hill overlooking the panoramic plain.
 the White Elephant - Afyon is twinned with the town of Hamm in Germany, and now has a large statue of Hamm's symbolic white elephant.

With its rich architectural heritage, the city is a member of the European Association of Historic Towns and Regions .

Twin towns – sister cities
  Nyíregyháza, Hungary, since 1992
  Greece, Athens, since 1999
  Turkistan, Kazakhstan
  Hamm, Germany, since 2005
  Peć, Kosovo, since 2008
  Yunfu, China, since 2007
  Latakia, Syria, since 2009

Notable natives
Following list is alphabetically sorted after family name.
 Mihran Mesrobian (1889-1975), architect and decorated Ottoman soldier
 İlker Başbuğ (1943), former Chief of the General Staff of Turkey
 Ali Çetinkaya (1879-1949), Ottoman Army officer and Turkish politician
 Fikret Emek (1963), retired military personnel of the Special Forces Command
 Veysel Eroğlu (1948), Minister of Environment and Forestry
 Bülent İplikçioğlu (1952), historian
 Fazıl Şenel (1972), High Commissioner / Board Member of EMRA (EPDK), Ex-President of BOTAŞ
 Ahmed Karahisari (1468- 1566), Ottoman calligrapher
 Gülcan Mıngır (1989), European Champion Middle-distance runner
 Ahmet Necdet Sezer (1941), former President of Turkey
 Sibel Özkan Öz (1988), Olympic medalist female weightlifter
 Nurgül Yeşilçay (1976), actress

See also
 2012 Afyonkarahisar arsenal explosion

References

External links

 Afyon Karahisar 
 City council website 
 Governor's office
 Afyonkarahisar community and information
 Afyon Blog 
 Afyonkarahisar City Daily Photo 
 Afyon Guide and Photo Album 
 Afyon and the Phrygians 
 Afyon Kocatepe University 
 Department of forestry and the environment 
 Afyon Science High School 
 Afyon Zafer College 

 
Populated places in Afyonkarahisar District
Anatolia